Kabul Press is a news and discussion website from Afghanistan. Kabul Press is an important on-line Afghan media outlet with sections in Dari Persian and English updated daily. Editor Kamran Mir Hazar has been arrested twice by the Afghan secret police, prompting an outcry from international freedom-of-press organisations.

References

External links
 
 Dari version/ 
Kabul Press Facebook Page
Kabul Press Telegram
Kabul Press Twitter
Kabul Press Instagram

Afghan news websites
Mass media in Kabul